John Henry Cook (July 19, 1840 to July 22, 1916) was an English soldier who fought in the American Civil War. Cook received the United States' highest award for bravery during combat, the Medal of Honor, for his action at Pleasant Hill in Louisiana on 9 April 1864. He was honored with the award on 19 September 1890.

Biography
Cook was born in London on 19 July 1840. He enlisted with the 119th Illinois Infantry from Quincy, Illinois in August 1862, and mustered out with his regiment in June 1865. He died on 22 July 1916 and his remains are interred at the Woodlawn Cemetery in New York.

Medal of Honor citation

See also

List of American Civil War Medal of Honor recipients: A–F

References

1840 births
1916 deaths
English-born Medal of Honor recipients
Military personnel from London
People of Illinois in the American Civil War
Union Army officers
United States Army Medal of Honor recipients
American Civil War recipients of the Medal of Honor
British emigrants to the United States